Omm ol Sakhar (also Romanized as Omm ol Şakhar, Omm oş Şakhar, Omm-os Şakhar, and Omm-os-saxr; also known as Bardān) is a village in Jaffal Rural District, in the Central District of Shadegan County, Khuzestan Province, Iran. At the 2006 census, its population was 109, in 20 families.

References 

Populated places in Shadegan County